Mallori Nicole (born November 10, 1994 as Mallory Nicole Leitner) is an American pop artist from St. Louis, Missouri. Since the age of six she has been performing and singing. This was just the start of Mallori's passion for the music industry. JoJo and Jordin Sparks are her idols. They inspired her to sing. Her recent popular song is "Not gonna be used".

Biography

Personal life
Mallori Nicole was born on November 10, 1994, in St. Louis, Missouri. Since the age of six she has been performing and singing. Her family would gather around at home to watch her sing and dance in the living room. She is the daughter of John Leitner and Michelle "Douglas" Leitner. Her younger brother is named Jake Leitner. Mallori's parents wanted her to be happy so they supported her in everything she decided to do. Thanks to Michelle and John Mallori was able to learn some instruments. Nicole successfully visited Festus High School and was always interested in learning new things or to travel around the world.

Career
By the age of 12, Nicole decided that she wanted to sing in the school's choir. Mallori seen a huge opportunity to try out for a solo part and with the help of her friends and choir teacher Mr. Rhine, she pushed herself to try out.

Singing in the high school choir was just the beginning of things for Mallori's professional career. Mallori then begun to sing more often and was taught how to control her vocals with much practice and some vocal training here and there. One of the many talents Mallori holds is playing the clarinet, besides singing and acting. Mallori's parents supported her in everything she decided to do.

Mallori Nicole has worked with producers such as Popo with the bakery productions who produced "Pop, Lock, and Drop It for Baby Huey", Brian and Mark with On2productions, and Terex who produced "Stupid" for Joka.

One of Mallori's famous performing spots was the Saint Louis Arch location. Upon performing there lead to being noticed by an Indie Label. In 2009 Mallori Nicole won Pop Artist of the year at the Teen Swag Awards, and won Alternative Artist of the year at the St. Louis Traffic Music Awards.

Other places she have performed is Kiener Plaza St Louis, Cicero St. Louis, Rock and Roll Hall Of Fame in Cleveland, OH, Six Flags, St. Louis, MO, Twin City Days in Crystal City MO, Festus Firecracker Festival, and with Dennis Bono Show is Las Vegas with David Osborne and many more to come.

Mallori has had the honor to sing for our 39th President Jimmy Carter in Americus, GA, she also performed with the pianist for the presidents David Osborne. Another highlight of Mallori career was singing for the Mayor of Festus, MO.

Awards and nominations

References

1994 births
Living people
American women pop singers
Musicians from St. Louis
Singers from Missouri
21st-century American women singers
21st-century American singers